Ministry of Reconstruction is the ministry that is responsible for reconstruction in Somalia.

References

Government of Somalia